HMS Afridi was a  of the Royal Navy launched in 1907 and sold for scrap in 1919. During the First World War she served in the North Sea and the English Channel with the 6th Destroyer Flotilla and as part of the Dover Patrol.

It is assumed - though never definitely confirmed - that explosive sweeps deployed by Afridi were responsible for the destruction of the German U-boat , which on 23 April 1916 departed Zeebrugge for a patrol off the mouth of the Thames and was never heard from again.

Construction and design
HMS Afridi was ordered from Armstrong Whitworth in September 1905, one of five Tribal-class destroyers ordered for the Royal Navy as part of the 1905–06 shipbuilding programme. Design of the ships was left to the builders, with the Admiralty only laying down loose requirements, although the builder's designs did need to be approved by the Director of Naval Construction before orders were placed. The ships were required to be powered by steam turbines, with cruising turbines fitted to improve range, fed by oil-fired boilers. Freeboard was to be at least  at the ship's bow. Armament was two be three 12-pounder (3-inch, 76 mm) guns, with the older 12 cwt gun chosen to save money, and two 18 in (450 mm) torpedo tubes. It was realised during construction that the armament of the Tribals was too light, with the two ships ordered as part of the 1906–07 programme being armed with two 4-inch (102 mm) guns. In October 1908, it was decided to strengthen the armament of the first five Tribals, including Afridi, by adding another two 12-pounder guns. This was done to Afridi prior to acceptance by the Royal Navy.

These drove three propeller shafts, with one propeller per shaft. Three short funnels were fitted. The two forward 12-pounder guns were mounted side-by-side on the ship's forecastle, with the third gun aft. Two spare torpedoes were carried.

Afridi was laid down at Armstrong's Elswick shipyard in August 1906 and was launched on 8 May 1907. The ship's trials were troublesome, with propeller and turbine problems being encountered, with poor weather and industrial action causing delays.

Service
Afridi was commissioned on 10 September 1909, 26 months after the contracted date, the last destroyer to be built by Armstrongs, joining the 1st Destroyer Flotilla. By 1913, Afridi had joined the 4th Destroyer Flotilla, based at Portsmouth. In October that year, the Tribals were officially designated the F class, and as such the letter "F" was painted on Afridis bow.

In February 1914, the Tribals, whose range was too short for effective open sea operations, were sent to Dover, forming the 6th Destroyer Flotilla. On the outbreak of the First World War, the 6th Flotilla formed the basis of the Dover Patrol, with which the Tribal class, including Afridi, served for the duration of the war. Early in the war, the main means of detecting submerged submarines was the indicator net, in which a submarine would get caught up in the net, with movement of an attached buoy indicating the location of the submarine. On 20 February 1915, the destroyer  spotted a disturbance in indicator nets in the Dover Straits, and signalled to Afridi to deploy her explosive anti-submarine sweep, but no submarine was found. On 6 April 1915, the drifter Hyacinth spotted a periscope of the German submarine  and called up Afridi, which was nearby. While the submarine carried away a section of the netting, the indicator buoys did not deploy, so U-33 was able to escape unscathed.

On 24 March 1916, the cross-Channel ferry  was torpedoed by the German submarine . Afridi was one of a number of destroyers sent to respond to distress signals from the damaged ferry, and helped in the rescue operations.

In order to counter German destroyers armed with 105 mm guns, which outgunned British destroyers of the Dover patrol, a number of the Tribal class were rearmed. Afridi had her 12-pounder guns replaced by two 4.7-inch (120 mm) QF guns between April and October 1917, also receiving a single 2-pounder "pom-pom" autocannon anti-aircraft gun and a Maxim machine gun.

On 22–23 April, Afridi took part in an attack on the German-held port of Ostend in Belgium, which took place at the same time as a similar attack on Zeebrugge, with the objective of denying the use of these ports for German surface vessels and submarines. While the attack on Zeebrugge was a partial success, the Ostend part of the operation was a failure, as the blockships missed the entry to the harbour and run aground, so that the port was not blocked.

Afridi along with Zubian, Cossack and Viking were all offered for sale at Immingham in November 1919. Afridi was sold for scrapping on 9 December 1919, and was eventually sunk as a target on 9 April 1930.

Notes

Citations

Bibliography

External links
 HMS Afridi Index of 19th Century Naval Vessels
 

 

Tribal-class destroyers (1905)
Ships built on the River Tyne
1907 ships
World War I destroyers of the United Kingdom
Ships built by Armstrong Whitworth